HMS Delhi was a  that served with the Royal Navy through the Second World War, from the Caribbean to eastern China. She was laid down in 1917, launched in 1918 and commissioned for service in 1919, serving until decommissioning in mid-1945 due to extensive battle damage, and was to be scrapped in 1948 after lengthy war and peacetime service around the world.

Service history
After completion, sea trials and working up as part the 1st Light Cruiser Squadron with the Atlantic Fleet, Delhi served in the Baltic as part of a wider multinational intervention in the Russian Civil War against the nascent Soviet republics. Departing the Baltic, Delhi returned to Britain and spent the next three years with the Atlantic Fleet.

Returning in December 1924, she was paid off from the Special Service Squadron and joined the 1st Cruiser Squadron with the Mediterranean Fleet in January 1925. After a brief ten-month detachment to the China Station, engaging in anti-piracy operations, she returned to the Mediterranean before being paid off to refit.

The 1930s dawned with Delhi cruising the Caribbean as part of the 8th Cruiser Squadron on the America and West Indies Station. During the Carib War, Delhis guns were called to deter the actions of local insurgents on Dominica and landed a detachment of Royal Marines. Her West Indies service ended in 1933, and she deployed with the 3rd Cruiser Squadron, once again serving with the Mediterranean Fleet.

Based at Malta at this time, with the Spanish Civil War raging, Delhi operated off Spain, picking up refugees from Palma de Mallorca, Barcelona and Valencia, under the command of Captain Farquhar Smith RAN. During these operations, she was engaged by the Nationalist heavy cruiser , coming under heavy fire, as well as suffering from aerial attacks.

When World War II broke out, Delhi was freshly out of reserve, and joined the 11th Cruiser Squadron at Scapa Flow. While patrolling the Iceland-Faroes Gap, Delhi captured the freighter Rheingold, and then intercepted and assisted in the scuttling of the blockade-runner Mecklenburg, whose crew scuttled the merchant vessel, and abandoned ship. Delhis captain decided that boarding to attempt to salvage the ship was impractical due to the sea state, and instead sank Mecklenburg with gunfire.

However, with Newcastle and Delhi shadowing and the rapid approach of heavy units of the Home Fleet, Admiral Marschall withdrew his battleships into inclement weather, slipping his pursuers and retreating to Wilhelmshaven.

Deployed to the Mediterranean in March 1940, Delhi undertook extensive operations as part of Force H against Vichy and Italian forces in Italy and North Africa. After five months service in the Mediterranean, she joined Force M at Freetown, operating off West Africa and in the South Atlantic. Delhi and her sister ship Dragon participated in Operation Menace, the Battle of Dakar, and then continued in the trade protection role in the South Atlantic.

From May to December, 1941 Delhi was refitted as an anti-aircraft cruiser at the Brooklyn Navy Yard. This refit included 5-inch/38 calibre guns originally intended for the US destroyer , and were hand-picked by Edisons commanding officer, but were transferred to Delhi on the direct instructions President Roosevelt. With her new dual purpose main armament, she provided shore bombardment and AA support for a number of Allied landings in the Mediterranean, (Algiers, Sicily, Salerno and the Anzio Landings). On 20 November 1942 Delhi was damaged by enemy action in Algiers Bay when her stern was blown open by a bomb dropped by Italian aircraft. Two crewmen were killed in the attack. She returned to Britain and was under repair until April 1943.

On 3 September 1943, six days before the Landings at Salerno, she collided with the cruiser  in the Straits of Messina whilst laying a smokescreen. She was repaired at sea and remained in service for the landings where she provided shore bombardment and AA support. Continuing to serve through the rest of the war, Delhi took part in Operation Dragoon, a follow-up to D-Day in the South of France to utilise Free French troops and to open new supply routes to Allied forces in Europe.

On 12 February 1945 she was attacked by German explosive motorboats in the harbour at Split, Croatia, where she had, three months beforehand, hosted the German surrender. The attack missed Delhi and struck LCF-8, a Landing Craft Flak. The force of the resulting explosion damaged Delhis rudder and a propeller shaft bracket.

Anti-aircraft involvement

The British HACS and FKS anti-aircraft fire control systems were less than satisfactory in service during World War II. While Delhi was in refit the British asked that the U.S. Navy's MK 37 Gun Fire Control System be installed as a test bed along with the 5-inch/38 calibre guns. The results were most impressive to the service and a request was issued for 42 of the systems to be sent to the Royal Navy for installations on their ships. The resulting installations were carried out and a further 40 units were asked for. The war ended before the second order could be filled. Delhis contribution in this area was thus substantial.

Disposal
Delhi returned to Britain and was laid up after the war. She was assessed as uneconomic to fully repair as an aged design in a rapidly downsizing Royal Navy, and was instead sold on 22 January 1948 to be broken up. She arrived at the yards of Cashmore, of Newport, Wales in April 1948 to be scrapped.

References

Publications

External links

 HMS Delhi at U-boat.net
 Ships of the Danae class

 

Danae-class cruisers of the Royal Navy
Ships built on the River Tyne
1918 ships
Allied intervention in the Russian Civil War
World War II cruisers of the United Kingdom
Ships built by Armstrong Whitworth